Leah Renee Cudmore (born 1 October 1985), often credited as Leah Cudmore or Leah Renee, is a Canadian actress and singer.

Career
Cudmore has had recurring roles in television series including MVP, Runaway and Blue Mountain State. As a voice actress, she has performed in series including Franklin and Growing Up Creepie. In 2011, she acquired notoriety co-starring "Bunny Alice" in the NBC series The Playboy Club. In 2013, she starred as Maggie Bronson on the Canadian sitcom Satisfaction.

Music
As a singer, in February 2009, she released her first single, "iBF (Imaginary Boyfriend)". Some months later, she also released her debut CD, Storybook, composed of eleven pieces, her first single included. She co-wrote all songs of her first album.

Personal life
Cudmore is in a long-term relationship with actor Nick Zano. They have a son born in July 2016, and a daughter born in 2018.

Filmography

References

External links
 

1985 births
Canadian child actresses
Canadian film actresses
Canadian dance musicians
Canadian television actresses
Canadian voice actresses
Living people
Actresses from Toronto
Musicians from Toronto
21st-century Canadian women singers